Minnie Bruce Pratt (born September 12, 1946) is an American poet, educator, activist and essayist. She retired in 2015 from her position as Professor of Writing and Women's Studies at Syracuse University in Syracuse, New York where she was invited to help develop the university's first LGBT Study Program.

Profile
Pratt was born in Selma, Alabama, and grew up in Centreville, Alabama. Her parents are Virginia Brown Pratt, a social worker, and William Luther Pratt Jr., a clerk. She graduated with a B.A. from the University of Alabama (1968) and earned a Ph.D. in English literature from the University of North Carolina (1979).

In 1977, Pratt helped to found WomonWrites, a Southeastern lesbian writers conference. While attending the University of North Carolina in 1978, she joined Feminary, a southern feminist writing collective based in Chapel Hill and Durham, North Carolina. She would later join LIPS, a Washington, D.C. lesbian direct action group, which participated in civil disobedience at the 1987 protest of the Bowers vs. Hardwick sodomy law decision made by the U.S. Supreme Court.

Her political affiliations include the International Action Center, the National Women's Fightback Network, and the National Writers Union.

Pratt has written extensively on race, class, gender and sexual theory. She, along with lesbian writers Chrystos and Audre Lorde, received a Hellman/Hammett grant from the Fund for Free Expression to writers "who have been victimized by political persecution." Pratt, Chrystos and Lorde were chosen because of their experience as "a target of right-wing and fundamentalist forces during the recent attacks on the National Endowment for the Arts."

In 1996, Pratt starred in Rosa von Praunheim 's film Transexual Menace.

Pratt is the author of Crimes Against Nature (1990), a book where she describes losing custody of her children because of her lesbianism. She is a contributing editor to Workers World newspaper.

She is on the faculty of the distance education school. Union Institute & University.

Personal life
Pratt lives in Syracuse, New York. She is the widow of author-activist Leslie Feinberg, who died in November 2014. Feinberg and Pratt married in New York and Massachusetts in 2011.

Pratt has two sons by a previous heterosexual marriage to poet Marvin E. Weaver II, which ended in divorce in Fayetteville, North Carolina, in 1975. She lost custody of her children because the state criminalized homosexual activity at the time.

Published works
  ASIN: B000HF76DW
  Chosen for the 100 Best Lesbian and Gay Nonfiction Books, by the Publishing Triangle, 2004.
  American Library Association Gay and Lesbian Book Award in Literature 1991, The Lamont Poetry Selection of The Academy of American Poets, 1989.
 
 
 
  Best Gay and Lesbian Book of the Year by ForeWord: Magazine of Independent Bookstores and Booksellers, 2000.
  ASIN: B0006S92LE
  Chosen Lambda Literary Award in Lesbian Poetry, 2003.

Honors and awards
 1989 - Lamont Poetry Selection of the Academy of American Poets for Crime Against Nature
 1990 - Creative Writing Fellowship in Poetry, from the National Endowment for the Arts
 1990 - Harriette Simpson Arnow Prize for Poetry, from The American Voice
 1991 - American Library Association Gay and Lesbian Book Award in Literature for Crime Against Nature
 1999 - Independent Booksellers Award for Walking Back Up Depot Street
 2002 - Lucille Medwick Memorial Award from the Poetry Society of America, "Picking Up a Job Application"
 2003 - Lambda Literary Award for The Dirt She Ate
 2005 - Fellowship in Poetry, New Jersey State Council on the Arts
 2011 - Publishing Triangle's Audre Lorde Award for lesbian poetry for Inside the Money Machine

References

External links
 Official site
 Page at Syracuse University
Pratt, Minnie Bruce. "When I Say 'Steal,' Who Do You Think Of?", Southern Spaces, July 21, 2004.
Pratt, Minnie Bruce. "No Place." Southern Spaces, July 27, 2004, http://southernspaces.org/2004/no-place.
 Guide to the Minnie Bruce Pratt Papers at Duke University

1946 births
American essayists
Lambda Literary Award for Lesbian Poetry winners
Stonewall Book Award winners
American lesbian writers
Living people
Activists from Selma, Alabama
Syracuse University faculty
University of Alabama alumni
University of North Carolina at Chapel Hill alumni
American LGBT poets
Writers from Syracuse, New York
American women poets
American women essayists
LGBT people from Alabama
LGBT academics
American women academics
21st-century American women writers